The 1917 Alabama Crimson Tide football team (variously "Alabama", "UA" or "Bama") represented the University of Alabama in the 1917 college football season. It was the Crimson Tide's 25th overall and 22nd season as a member of the Southern Intercollegiate Athletic Association (SIAA). The team was led by head coach Thomas Kelley, in his third year, and played their home games at University Field in Tuscaloosa, at Rickwood Field in Birmingham and at Soldiers Field in Montgomery, Alabama. They finished the season with a record of five wins, two losses and one tie (5–2–1 overall, 3–1–1 in the SIAA).

Game summaries
Alabama's 1917 season opener against the "Second Ambulance Company of Ohio" at Soldiers Field in Montgomery was the only game the Crimson Tide ever played at that location. The 2nd, which was part of the 37th Division training in Montgomery, only got two first downs.

Alabama opened the season with four consecutive, shutout victories over the Second Ambulance Company, Marion Military Institute,  and Ole Miss. In those four games, Alabama outscored their opponents by a margin of 130 to 0. After a tie against Sewanee and a loss to Vanderbilt at Rickwood Field, Alabama won their only road game at Kentucky.

In the season finale, Camp Gordon, the second military opponent Alabama faced as the country mobilized for World War I, beat the Tide 19–6. Camp Gordon had several players with college experience, including Adrian Van de Graaff, formerly of Alabama.

Joe Sewell, who went on to a Hall of Fame baseball career with the Cleveland Indians and New York Yankees, lettered in football for Alabama in 1917, 1918 and 1919.

Schedule

Personnel

Varsity letter winners

Coaching staff

References
General

 

Specific

Alabama
Alabama Crimson Tide football seasons
Alabama Crimson Tide football